The men's tournament of the 2022 Beach Volleyball World Championships was held from 10 to 19 June 2022.

Qualification
There are 48 teams qualified for the tournament.

Schedule
The 48 teams are split into twelve pools, where the first two and the four best-third placed teams advance to the knockout stage. The remaining eight third-ranked teams play in a lucky loser round to determine the last four teams. After that, a knockout system will be used.

Preliminary round
The draw was held on 21 May 2022. If two teams are tied in points, the overall set and points ratio will be used. If three teams are tied on points, the matches against those teams determine the ranking.

All times are local (UTC+2).

Pool A

Pool B

Pool C

Pool D

Pool E

Pool F

Pool G

Pool H

Pool I

Pool J

Pool K

Pool L

Ranking of third-placed teams

Lucky losers playoffs

Knockout stage

Bracket

Round of 32

Round of 16

Quarterfinals

Semifinals

Bronze medal match

Gold medal match

Final ranking

See also
2022 Beach Volleyball World Championships – Women's tournament

References

External links
Official website

Men's